Argusville is a city in Cass County, North Dakota, United States. The population was 480 at the 2020 census. Increasing from 147 a decade earlier due to a huge housing boom from 2004 to 2008. Argusville was founded in 1881.

History
Argusville was platted in 1881, when the railroad was extended to that point. The city most likely derived its name from a local newspaper, the Daily Argus. A post office was established at Argusville in 1881, and remained in operation until 1982.

Geography
Argusville is located at  (47.051565, -96.935662).

Demographics

2010 census
As of the census of 2010, there were 475 people, 151 households, and 128 families living in the city. The racial makeup of the city was 97.9% White, 0.2% African American, 1.5% Native American, and 0.4% from two or more races.

There were 151 households, of which 58.9% had children under the age of 18 living with them, 76.8% were married couples living together, 4.0% had a female householder with no husband present, 4.0% had a male householder with no wife present, and 15.2% were non-families. 11.3% of all households were made up of individuals, and 3.3% had someone living alone who was 65 years of age or older. The average household size was 3.15 and the average family size was 3.42.

The median age in the city was 31.7 years. 38.7% of residents were under the age of 18; 3.7% were between the ages of 18 and 24; 38.1% were from 25 to 44; 15.1% were from 45 to 64; and 4.4% were 65 years of age or older. The gender makeup of the city was 53.3% male and 46.7% female.

2000 census
As of the census of 2000, there were 147 people, 62 households, and 45 families living in the city, though the town had a housing boom from 2004 to 2009. The population density was 36.8 people per square mile (14.2/km2). There were 65 housing units at an average density of 16.3 per square mile (6.3/km2). The racial makeup of the city was 100.00% White. Hispanic or Latino of any race were 0.68% of the population.

There were 62 households, out of which 32.3% had children under the age of 18 living with them, 71.0% were married couples living together, 1.6% had a female householder with no husband present, and 27.4% were non-families. 21.0% of all households were made up of individuals, and 1.6% had someone living alone who was 65 years of age or older. The average household size was 2.37 and the average family size was 2.76.

In the city, the population was spread out, with 21.1% under the age of 18, 5.4% from 18 to 24, 32.0% from 25 to 44, 32.0% from 45 to 64, and 9.5% who were 65 years of age or older. The median age was 40 years. For every 100 females, there were 107.0 males. For every 100 females age 18 and over, there were 114.8 males.

The median income for a household in the city was $44,750, and the median income for a family was $53,750. Males had a median income of $31,786 versus $26,071 for females. The per capita income for the city was $19,984. None of the population and none of the families were below the poverty line.

References

Cities in Cass County, North Dakota
Cities in North Dakota
Populated places established in 1881
1881 establishments in Dakota Territory